Nandita Shah (born 1959) is an Indian homeopath and author. She started practicing as a doctor in 1981 and founded the non-governmental organization Sanctuary for Health and Reconnection to Animals and Nature (SHARAN) in 2005. She was presented with the 2016 Nari Shakti Puraskar.

Early life 
Nandita Shah was born 15 February 1959 in Mumbai. She qualified as a medical doctor specialized in homeopathy from CMP Homeopathic Medical College in Mumbai and has been practicing since 1981.  Shah has been vegan since 1985. She worked at Farm Sanctuary, an animal shelter in Watkins Glen, New York, as an intern then moved to Auroville in 1999.

Career 
Shah founded a non-governmental organization called Sanctuary for Health and Reconnection to Animals and Nature (SHARAN) to promote healthy eating in 2005. She believes that being vegan and eating raw foods can prevent issues such as depression, diabetes, hypertension and heart disease. During the COVID-19 pandemic in India, SHARAN offered free online cooking workshops.

Shah was one of four women from Tamil Nadu to receive the 2016 Nari Shakti Puraskar, presented in New Delhi by the President of India Pranab Mukherjee at Rashtrapati Bhavan. Shah is the author of the book Reversing Diabetes in 21 Days. She believes that consumption of the proteins in milk can be a cause of diabetes. As of 2020, she was living at Auroville.

References 

Auroville
People from Tamil Nadu
Indian homeopaths
21st-century Indian writers
Nari Shakti Puraskar winners
1959 births
Living people
Indian veganism activists